Buchtel may refer to:
 Buchtel (surname)
 Buchtel, Ohio
 Buchtel Community Learning Center, formerly known as Buchtel High School
 Buchtel College, the former name of the University of Akron, Ohio
 Buchtel College of Arts and Sciences at the University of Akron
 Buchtel(n), pastry made of yeast dough